Juan Pablo Domínguez Chonteco (born 30 October 1998) is a Mexican professional footballer who plays as a midfielder for Liga MX club Necaxa, on loan from Atlante.

Career statistics

Club

References

External links
 
 
 

Living people
1998 births
Association football midfielders
Atlante F.C. footballers
Club Necaxa footballers
Liga MX players
Liga de Expansión MX players
People from Ecatepec de Morelos
Footballers from the State of Mexico
Mexican footballers